Kenneth Wood (21 November 1930 – 8 September 2008) was a British middle-distance runner. He ran one of the early Four-minute mile runs and represented Great Britain at the 1956 Summer Olympics.

Career

Wood competed with the Sheffield United Harriers athletic club. Between 1954 and 1961 he won the Emsley Carr Mile a record four times. In this period he was selected to run for Great Britain in the 1956 Olympic 1500 metres finishing ninth in the final. 
 
Wood won the mile event at the AAA Championships in 1956 and 1959.

In May 1955 Wood finished second in a two-mile race behind Sándor Iharos both breaking the world two mile outdoor record. Woods time being 8:34.8.

He became the fourteenth athlete (the fifth from the UK) to officially run a Four-minute mile, achieving a time of 3:59.3 on 19 July 1957. He in fact finished fourth behind Derek Ibbotson, who set a new British record, Ron Delany and Stanislav Jungwirth.

On the 50th anniversary of Roger Bannister's first Four-minute mile, Wood claimed he had previously run under four minutes on 7 April 1954.

 This unofficial run being timed by explorer and then Sheffield University student Roy Koerner.

Wood died in September 2008.

Record

References

1933 births
2008 deaths
British male middle-distance runners
Athletes (track and field) at the 1956 Summer Olympics
Olympic athletes of Great Britain